Steinaker State Park is a state park and reservoir of Utah, USA, located  north of Vernal in Uintah County, Utah.

Steinaker State Park opened to the public in 1964. The climate is arid with hot summers and cold winters. Plant life at the park includes juniper, cacti, and sagebrush. Wildlife includes badgers, bobcats, coyotes, deer, and rabbits. Birds include golden eagles, hawks, bluebirds, vultures, owls, and osprey.

Steinaker State Park is named for John Steinaker, a member of a pioneer family of the region.

Park facilities
Steinaker is popular for swimming, fishing, boating, and waterskiing. Year-round park facilities include a sand beach, boat launching ramp, restrooms, 31 RV campsites, two group-use pavilions, and sewage disposal, and fish cleaning stations. Nearby attractions include Dinosaur National Monument, Flaming Gorge National Recreation Area, and Red Fleet and Utah Field House of Natural History state parks.

Steinaker Dam
The reservoir is fed by Ashley Creek and is part of the CUP-Vernal Unit project. It was constructed between 1959 and 1962.

References

External links

 Steinaker State Park

Protected areas established in 1964
Protected areas of Uintah County, Utah
State parks of Utah
Reservoirs in Utah
Lakes of Uintah County, Utah
Buildings and structures in Uintah County, Utah